The 8th Northwest Territories Legislative Assembly was the 15th assembly of the territorial government. The assembly lasted from 1975 until 1979. This was the first all elected council of the Northwest Territories since the 5th North West Assembly from 1902 to 1905. In honor of this achievement the Council renamed themselves the Legislative Assembly of the Northwest Territories despite still being officially called the Council of the Northwest Territories under the Northwest Territories Act.

By-elections
At least two by-elections occurred in this assembly.

References

External links
Northwest Territories Legislative Assembly homepage

008